DEGIRO is a European brokerage company, based in Amsterdam. It was founded in 2008 by a group of five former employees of Binck Bank to service the professional market.  In 2013, DEGIRO started offering its stockbrokerage services to retail investors, giving them online access to security exchanges worldwide. Investors can buy and sell such securities as common and preferred stocks, fixed income (bonds), options, mutual funds, warrants, and ETFs via an electronic trading platform or by phone.

Its fees are generally lower than those of established brokers.

History
DEGIRO was established in 2008. On 23 September 2013, DEGIRO launched its services for retail clients in the Netherlands. In 2014 and 2015, DEGIRO then expanded to offer its platform across other European countries.

On 22 September 2014, Euronext announced its partnership with DEGIRO regarding the distribution of retail services of Euronext. Upon publishing the third quarter results for 2014, the partnership was seen as a plan for Euronext to compete more effectively in the Dutch retail segment.

The company launched its English-language platform in the United Kingdom on 11 June 2015. The countries they now offer services to are Netherlands, Belgium, Italy, France, Austria, Switzerland, Germany, Czech republic, Spain, Portugal, Poland, Greece, Hungary, Denmark, Sweden, United Kingdom, Norway, Finland, and Ireland.

In December 2019, flatex AG (a German online broker) announced to acquire 100% of DEGIRO, but keep the existing DEGIRO brand. In July 2020, they closed the "transaction of acquiring 100% of DEGIRO shares".

Regulatory
DEGIRO is supervised by the Netherlands Authority for the Financial Markets (AFM) and under prudential supervision of the De Nederlandsche Bank (DNB). It is also registered with the Financial Conduct Authority (FCA). DEGIRO has previously received criticism from regulators over its business practices and the quality of its IT infrastructure.

Trading platforms
Degiro supplies its clients with a browser-based HTML trading platform developed in-house, for desktop and mobile devices. It features free real-time streaming prices on certain European stocks, as well as five levels order book. The platform supports combined orders (spread portfolio compilation), and the company has announced plans for fractional investing (investing in fractions of products).

Degiro also provides users of the platform with the ability to buy certain ETFs without any transaction costs. The ETFs are in the so called 'core selection'.

The 'core selection' lets users buy or sell ETFs from the core selection on the basis of a fair use policy. This means that they are eligible for one commission-free trade (a purchase or sale) per ETF. Any subsequent trade in the same ETF and direction will be executed commission-free, if the trade meets the following conditions:

 the trade is in the same direction (i.e. buy/sell) as the first trade that month

 the value of the transaction is at least 1000 EUR, USD or GBP.

Once an opposite trade or trade below 1000 EUR (or USD/GBP) is executed in the same ETF within the same calendar month, the rule will no longer apply to any subsequent trade in that ETF that month and regular fees will be charged.

Degiro offers this feature in various countries.

Awards
In the Netherlands, DEGIRO earned the first place in a 2015 survey for the cheapest broker in Financieel Dagblad. In 2014, VEB considered DEGIRO to be the cheapest broker for investments in shares, bonds, options and turbos  and in the same year, Beleggers Belangen elected the company as the #1 Dutch broker in regard to costs, trade opportunities, convenience and service. Consumentenbond, a Dutch non-profit organization which promotes consumer protection considered DEGIRO to be the cheapest Dutch broker. DEGIRO also won the Golden Bull Award in 2015, where Dutch brokers are judged in different categories, such as trading opportunities, commission fees, terms and conditions and investment tools.

Internationally, DEGIRO has been awarded by Privata Affärer in Sweden and by Finanztreff in Germany, due to the low trading prices for retail clients.

Criticism
While the broker received various awards, there also have been critical reactions. The process of internalization of customer's orders against DeGiro's own hedge fund HiQ Market Neutral fund was subject of investigative press. Clients were denied execution of passive orders, because the internalizer jumped in front of them.

Selling of orders 
In June 2021, Dutch state media reported that DEGIRO would start selling customer orders to Tradegate. Dutch regulators did not approve this practice, known as  payment for order flow or PFOF. However, following DEGIRO's takeover by German company Flatex, the money of its Dutch customers is now stored on a German bank account. By consequence, DEGIRO's business practices largely fall under German jurisdiction, where the practice is legal.

In an e-mail to its customers, DEGIRO responded that some press coverage had not been accurate. DEGIRO states that the Tradegate deal allows users to trade outside regular opening hours of stock markets. It also notes that users retain full control over whether they send orders to Tradegate.

Stability of IT infrastructure 
In December 2021, the Dutch national bank raised concerns about the technical quality of DEGIRO's IT infrastructure. It had ruled that DEGIRO was insufficiently protected against crashes and hacks. As a result, DEGIRO was ordered to put aside a liquid capital reserve of over 3 million euros. DEGIRO stated that in the last half year, it had significantly invested in IT infrastructure improvements.

On multiple occasions, Reddit users have reported being unable to place orders with DEGIRO due to downtime.

References

External links

Financial services companies of the United Kingdom
Financial derivative trading companies
Foreign exchange companies
Online brokerages
Financial services companies established in 2008
Companies based in Amsterdam
Multinational companies headquartered in the Netherlands
Dutch brands
Dutch companies established in 2008